Narges Rashidi is an American-German actress of Iranian descent. She was born in Iran where her father was an army colonel. In 1987 she settled with her family in Turkey. A year later the family moved to Germany, where she grew up and studied acting. She has lived primarily in Los Angeles since 2005.

Rashidi has appeared in many independent films and television productions,starting with the experimental film Venussian Tabutasco by Daryush Shokof in 2004 and primarily in Germany. She received widespread acclaim for her starring role in the 2016 film Under the Shadow by Babak Anvari, which premiered at the Sundance Film Festival. Variety cited her as "a favorite breakthrough performance" at Sundance. The magazine hailed her "intense yet fine-grained work... as a fiercely intelligent, progressive-minded Iranian woman infuriated by the direction of her country since the Islamic Revolution," noting "Rashidi plays her character like a musical instrument going slowly out of tune; it’s a performance rich in both motherly love and scream-queen abandon."

Filmography

Film

Television

Awards
 Best Breakthrough Actress award, A2Z, New York Independent International Film & Video Festival, 2007.

References

External links
 
 https://fr-fr.facebook.com/nargesrashidiofficial/
 http://www.interviewmagazine.com/film/narges-rashidi#_

21st-century German actresses
Iranian diaspora film people
People from Khorramabad
Iranian emigrants to Germany
German expatriates in the United States
Living people
1980 births
Iranian emigrants to the United States